Big Twist and the Mellow Fellows was an American blues and rhythm and blues group.

The frontman was the singer and harmonica player Larry "Big Twist" Nolan (né Lawrence Millard Nolan; 23 September 1937, Terre Haute, Indiana – 14 March 1990, Broadview, Illinois). He began singing in church at the age of six. During the 1950s he sang and played drums in a bar band, the Mellow Fellows, performing everything from R & B, blues and country music. At the beginning of the 1970s he joined with guitarist Pete Special and tenor saxophonist Terry Ogolini, and the band put out albums on Flying Fish Records and Alligator Records.   Over the decade, the group earned a loyal following and moved from private parties to the big stages. The band's repertoire was a mixture of soul, rhythm and blues, and rock, a mixture that was equally popular among young and old.

Larry Nolan died in March 1990 of a heart attack. The group played on, with new singer Martin Allbritton, from Carbondale, Illinois. The saxophonist and producer Gene "Daddy G" Barge often appeared as a guest vocalist. After the founding member Peter Special left the band, they called themselves the Chicago Rhythm And Blues Kings, and remain a popular band in Illinois.

Discography
1980 Big Twist & The Mellow Fellows (Flying Fish Records)
1982 "One Track Mind" (Flying Fish Records)
1983 Playing for Keeps (Alligator Records)
1987 Live from Chicago! - Bigger Than Life !! (Alligator Records)
1990 Street Party (Alligator Records)

References

American blues musical groups
American rhythm and blues musical groups
Alligator Records artists